Hongjiang, formerly Qianyang County is a county-level city in Hunan Province, China, it is under the administration of the prefecture-level city of Huaihua.

Located on the southwest of the province and the south of Huaihua, the city is bordered to the north by Zhongfang County, to the northwest by Zhijiang County, to the south by Huitong County, to the east by Dongkou County. The city is divided into 26 township-level divisions, including four subdistricts and two townships of Hongjiang District. The government seat is Qiancheng Town.

History
The former Hongjiang City was merged with Qianyang County to form the present Hongjiang City in 1997. However, the local residents of the former Hongjiang City strongly resisted this merger. The antagonism and uncertainties were being played out for the first time between the residents and local authorities, and it lasted for some time. The authorities forced to give tacit consent to the status, the former Hongjiang was separated from the new Hongjiang City. As a part of Hongjiang City, the former Hongjiang was reformed as a special management area named Hongjiang District, the Hongjiang District is directly administrated by the government of Huaihua City.

Transportation
China National Highway 209
Anjiang East railway station on the Huaihua–Shaoyang–Hengyang railway is located here.

Climate
Hongjiang has a humid subtropical climate (Köppen climate classification: Cfa).

See also
Changqi, a village in Anjiang, Hongjiang

References

External links
 Official website of Hongjiang government

 
County-level divisions of Hunan
Cities in Hunan
Huaihua